In Norse mythology Valhalla is the anglicised name for  ("hall of the slain"). It is described as a majestic hall located in Asgard and presided over by the god Odin. Half of those who die in combat enter Valhalla, while the other half are chosen by the goddess Freyja to reside in Fólkvangr. The masses of those killed in combat (known as the Einherjar) along with various legendary Germanic heroes and kings, live in Valhalla until Ragnarök when they will march out of its many doors to fight in aid of Odin against the jötnar. 

Valhalla is attested in the Poetic Edda, compiled in the 13th century from earlier traditional sources, in the Prose Edda (written in the 13th century by Snorri Sturluson), in Heimskringla (also written in the 13th century by Snorri Sturluson), and in stanzas of an anonymous 10th century poem commemorating the death of Eric Bloodaxe known as Eiríksmál as compiled in Fagrskinna. Valhalla inspired innumerable works of art, publication titles, and elements of popular culture, and is synonymous with a martial (or otherwise) hall of the chosen dead.

Etymology
The Modern English noun Valhalla derives from Old Norse , a compound noun composed of two elements: the masculine noun  'the slain' and the feminine noun  'hall'. The form "Valhalla" comes from an attempt to clarify the grammatical gender of the word.  has cognates in other Germanic languages such as Old English  'the slain, slaughter, carnage', Old Saxon  'murder', Old High German 'battlefield, blood bath'. All of these forms descend from the Proto-Germanic masculine noun *walaz. Among related Old Norse concepts,  also appears as the first element of the noun  'chooser of the slain, valkyrie'.

The second element, is a common Old Norse noun. It is cognate to Modern English hall and offers the same meaning. Both developed from Proto-Germanic *xallō or *hallō, meaning 'covered place, hall', from the Proto-Indo-European root *kol-. As philologists such as Calvert Watkins note, the same Indo-European root produced Old Norse , a proper noun employed for both the name of another afterlife location and a supernatural female entity as its overseer, as well as the modern English noun hell. In Swedish folklore, some mountains traditionally regarded as abodes of the dead were also called .

Attestations

Poetic Edda
Valhalla is referenced at length in the Poetic Edda poem Grímnismál, and Helgakviða Hundingsbana II, while Valhalla receives lesser direct references in stanza 32 of the Völuspá, where the god Baldr's death is referred to as the "woe of Valhalla", and in stanzas 1 to 3 of Hyndluljóð, where the goddess Freyja states her intention of riding to Valhalla with Hyndla, in an effort to help Óttar, as well as in stanzas 6 through 7, where Valhalla is mentioned again during a dispute between the two.

Grímnismál
In stanzas 8 to 10 of Grímnismál, the god Odin (in the guise of Grímnir) proclaims Valhalla is in the realm of Glaðsheimr. Odin describes Valhalla as shining and golden, and it "rises peacefully" as seen from afar. From Valhalla, every day Odin chooses from those killed in combat. Valhalla has spear-shafts for rafters, a roof thatched with shields, coats of mail are strewn over its benches, a wolf hangs in front of its west doors, and an eagle hovers above it.

From stanzas 22 to 24, more details are given by Odin about Valhalla: the holy doors of the ancient gate Valgrind stand before Valhalla, Valhalla has five hundred and forty doors so eight hundred men can pass through simultaneously (from which the einherjar will flow forth to engage the wolf Fenrir at Ragnarök). Within Valhalla exists Thor's hall Bilskirnir, and within it exist five hundred and forty rooms, and of all the halls within Valhalla, Odin states he thinks his son's may be greatest. In stanzas 25 through 26, Odin states the goat Heiðrún and the hart Eikþyrnir stand on top of Valhalla and graze on the branches of the tree Læraðr. Heiðrún’s udder produces vats of mead, a liquor beyond compare, and Eikþyrnir's antlers drip liquid into the spring Hvergelmir from which flows forth all waters.

Helgakviða Hundingsbana II

In stanza 38 of the poem Helgakviða Hundingsbana II, the hero Helgi Hundingsbane dies and goes to Valhalla. In stanza 38, Helgi's glory there is described:

So was Helgi beside the chieftains
like the bright-growing ash beside the thorn-bush
and the young stag, drenched in dew,
who surpasses all other animals
and whose horns glow against the sky itself.

Prose follows after this stanza, stating a burial-mound was made for Helgi. After Helgi arrived in Valhalla, he was asked by Odin to manage things with him. In stanza 39, Helgi, now in Valhalla, has his former enemy Hunding—also in Valhalla—do menial tasks; fetching foot-baths for all of the men there, kindling fire, tying dogs, keeping watch of horses, and feeding the pigs before he can get any sleep. In stanzas 40 to 42, Helgi returns to Midgard from Valhalla with a host of men. An unnamed maid of Sigrún, Helgi's valkyrie wife, sees Helgi and his large host of men riding into the mound. The maid asks if she is experiencing a delusion, if Ragnarök is started, or if Helgi and his men were allowed to return.

In the following stanzas, Helgi responds none of these things occurred, and so Sigrún's maid goes home to Sigrún. The maid tells Sigrún the burial mound is opened, and Sigrún should go to Helgi there. Helgi asked her to come and tend his wounds after they opened and are bleeding. Sigrún goes into the mound, and finds Helgi is drenched in gore, his hair is thick with frost. Filled with joy at the re-union, Sigrún kisses him before he can remove his coat of mail, and asks how she can heal him. Sigrún makes a bed there, and the two sleep together in the enclosed burial mound. Helgi awakens, stating he must "ride along the blood-red roads, to set the pale horse to tread the path of the sky," and return before the rooster Salgófnir crows. Helgi and the host of men ride away, and Sigrún and her servant go back to their house. Sigrún orders her maid to wait for him by the mound the next night, but after she arrives at dawn, she finds he is still journeying. The prose narrative at the end of the poem relates Sigrún dies of sadness, but the two are thought to be re-born as Helgi Haddingjaskati and the valkyrie Kára.

Prose Edda
Valhalla is referenced in the Prose Edda books Gylfaginning and Skáldskaparmál.

Gylfaginning
Valhalla is first mentioned in chapter 2 of the Prose Edda book Gylfaginning, where it is described partially in euhemerized form. In the chapter, King Gylfi sets out to Asgard in the guise of an old man going by the name of Gangleri to find the source of the power of the gods.

The narrative states the Æsir prophesied his arrival and prepared grand illusions for him, so as Gangerli enters the fortress, he sees a hall of such a height, he has trouble seeing over it, and notices the roof of the hall is covered in golden shields, as if they were shingles. Snorri quotes a stanza by the skald Þjóðólfr of Hvinir (c. 900). As he continues, Gangleri sees a man in the doorway of the hall juggling short swords, and keeping seven in the air simultaneously. Among other things, the man says the hall belongs to his king, and adds he can take Gangleri to the king. Gangleri follows him, and the door closes behind him. All around him, he sees many living areas, and throngs of people, some of which are playing games, some are drinking, and others are fighting with weapons. Gangleri sees three thrones, and three figures sitting upon them: High sitting on the lowest throne, Just-As-High sitting on the next highest throne, and Third sitting on the highest. The man guiding Gangleri tells him High is the king of the hall.

In chapter 20, Third states Odin mans Valhalla with the Einherjar: those killed in battle and become Odin's adopted sons. In chapter 36, High states valkyries serve drinks and see to the tables in Valhalla, and Grímnismál stanzas 40 to 41 are quoted in reference to this. High continues the valkyries are sent by Odin to every battle; they choose who is to die, and determine victory.

In chapter 38, Gangleri says: "You say all men who have fallen in battle from the beginning of the world are now with Odin in Valhalla. With what does he feed them? I should think the crowd there is large." High responds this is indeed true, a huge amount are already in Valhalla, but yet this amount will seem to be too few before "the wolf comes." High describes there are never too many to feed in Valhalla, for they feast from Sæhrímnir (here described as a boar), and this beast is cooked every day and is again whole every night. Grímnismál stanza 18 is recounted. Gangleri asks if Odin eats the same food as the Einherjar, and High responds Odin needs nothing to eat—Odin only consumes wine—and he gives his food to his wolves Geri and Freki. Grímnismál stanza 19 is recounted. High additionally states, at sunrise, Odin sends his ravens Huginn and Muninn from Valhalla to fly throughout the entire world, and they return in time for the first meal there.

In chapter 39, Gangleri asks about the food and drinks the Einherjar consume, and asks if only water is available there. High replies of course, Valhalla has food and drinks fit for kings and jarls, for the mead consumed in Valhalla is produced from the udders of the goat Heiðrún, who in turn feeds on the leaves of the "famous tree" Læraðr. The goat produces so much mead in a day, it fills a massive vat large enough for all of the Einherjar in Valhalla to satisfy their thirst from it. High further states the stag Eikþyrnir stands atop Valhalla and chews on the branches of Læraðr. So much moisture drips from his horns, it falls down to the well Hvelgelmir, resulting in numerous rivers.

In chapter 40, Gangleri muses Valhalla must be quite crowded, to which High responds Valhalla is massive and remains roomy despite the large amount of inhabitants, and then quotes Grímnismál stanza 23. In chapter 41, Gangleri says Odin seems to be quite a powerful lord, controlling quite a big army, but he wonders how the Einherjar keep busy while they are not drinking. High replies daily, after they dressed and put on their war gear, they go out to the courtyard and battle one-on-one combat for sport. Then, before mealtime, they ride home to Valhalla and drink. High quotes Vafþrúðnismál stanza 41. In chapter 42, High describes "right at the beginning, while the gods were settling", they established Asgard, then built Valhalla. The death of the god Baldr is recounted in chapter 49, with the mistletoe used to kill Baldr is described as growing west of Valhalla.

Skáldskaparmál
At the beginning of Skáldskaparmál, a partially euhemerized account is given of Ægir visiting the gods in Asgard and shimmering swords are brought out and used as their sole source of light as they drink. There, numerous gods feast, they have plenty of strong mead, and the hall has wall-panels covered with attractive shields. This location is confirmed as Valhalla in chapter 33.

In chapter 2, a quote from the anonymous 10th century poem Eiríksmál is provided (see the Fagrskinna section below for more detail and another translation from another source):

What sort of dream is that, Odin? I dreamed I rose up before dawn to clear up Val-hall for slain people. I aroused the Einheriar, bade them get up to strew the benches, clean the beer-cups, the valkyries to serve wine for the arrival of a prince.

In chapter 17 of Skáldskaparmál, the jötunn Hrungnir is in a rage and, while attempting to catch up and attack Odin on his steed Sleipnir, ends up at the doors to Valhalla. There, the Æsir invite him in for a drink. Hrungnir goes in, demands a drink, and becomes drunk and belligerent, stating that he will remove Valhalla and take it to the land of the jötunn, Jötunheimr, among various other things. Eventually, the gods tire of his boasting and invoke Thor, who arrives. Hrungnir states that he is under the Aesir's protection as a guest and therefore he can't be harmed while in Valhalla. After an exchange of words, Hrungnir challenges Thor to a duel at the location of Griotunagardar, resulting in Hrungnir's death.

In chapter 34, the tree Glasir is stated as located in front of the doors of Valhalla. The tree is described as having foliage of red gold and being the most beautiful tree among both gods and men. A quote from a work by the 9th century skald Bragi Boddason is presented that confirms the description.

Heimskringla
Valhalla is mentioned in euhemerized form and as an element of remaining Norse pagan belief in Heimskringla. In chapter 8 of Ynglinga saga, the "historical" Odin is described as ordaining burial laws over his country. These laws include that all the dead are to be burned on a pyre on a burial mound with their possessions, and their ashes are to be brought out to sea or buried in the earth. The dead would then arrive in Valhalla with everything that one had on their pyre, and whatever one had hidden in the ground. Valhalla is additionally referenced in the phrase "visiting Odin" in a work by the 10th century skald Þjóðólfr of Hvinir describing that, upon his death, King Vanlandi went to Valhalla.

In chapter 32 of Hákonar saga Góða, Haakon I of Norway is given a pagan burial, which is described as sending him on his way to Valhalla. Verses from Hákonarmál are then quoted in support, themselves containing references to Valhalla.

Fagrskinna
In chapter 8 of Fagrskinna a prose narrative states that after the death of her husband Eric Bloodaxe, Gunnhild Mother of Kings had a poem composed about him. The composition is by an anonymous author from the 10th century and is referred to as Eiríksmál, and describes Eric Bloodaxe and five other kings arriving in Valhalla after their death. The poem begins with comments by Odin (as Old Norse Óðinn):

"What kind of a dream is it," said Óðinn,
in which just before daybreak,
I thought I cleared Valhǫll,
for coming of slain men?
I waked the Einherjar,
bade valkyries rise up,
to strew the bench,
and scour the beakers,

wine to carry,
as for a king's coming,
here to me I expect
heroes' coming from the world,
certain great ones,
so glad is my heart.

The god Bragi asks where a thundering sound is coming from, and says that the benches of Valhalla are creaking—as if the god Baldr had returned to Valhalla—and that it sounds like the movement of a thousand. Odin responds that Bragi knows well that the sounds are for Eric Bloodaxe, who will soon arrive in Valhalla. Odin tells the heroes Sigmund and Sinfjötli to rise to greet Eric and invite him into the hall, if it is indeed he.

Sigmund asks Odin why he would expect Eric more than any other king, to which Odin responds that Eric has reddened his gore-drenched sword with many other lands. Eric arrives, and Sigmund greets him, tells him that he is welcome to come into the hall, and asks him what other lords he has brought with him to Valhalla. Eric says that with him are five kings, that he will tell them the name of them all, and that he, himself, is the sixth.

Modern influence
The concept of Valhalla continues to influence modern popular culture. Examples include the Walhalla temple built by Leo von Klenze for Ludwig I of Bavaria between 1830 and 1847 near Regensburg, Germany, and the Tresco Abbey Gardens Valhalla museum built by August Smith around 1830 to house ship figureheads from shipwrecks that occurred at the Isles of Scilly, England, near the museum.

References to Valhalla appear in literature, art, and other forms of media. Examples include K. Ehrenberg's charcoal illustration Gastmahl in Walhalla (mit einziehenden Einheriern) (1880), Richard Wagner's depiction of Valhalla in his opera cycle Der Ring des Nibelungen (1848–1874), the Munich, Germany-based Germanic Neopagan magazine Walhalla (1905–1913), the book series Magnus Chase and the Gods of Asgard by Rick Riordan, the comic series Valhalla (1978–2009) by Peter Madsen, and its subsequent animated film of the same name (1986). 
Valhalla also gives its name to a thrill ride at Blackpool Pleasure Beach, UK.

Before Hunter S. Thompson became the counter-culture's Gonzo journalist, he lived in Big Sur, California, while writing his novel The Rum Diary. He wrote "Big Sur is very like Valhalla—a place that a lot of people have heard of, and that very few can tell you anything about" (Proud Highway: Saga of a Desperate Southern Gentleman, chapter 20).

In the 2015 film Mad Max: Fury Road, the cult of the War Boys believe a heroic death in the service of dictator Immortan Joe will take them to Valhalla.

A video game Assassin's Creed Valhalla was released in November 2020. The video game Apex Legends features a character named Bloodhound, who often references Valhalla and the Allfather, a commonly used kenning for the Norse god Odin.

Elton John's first album, Empty Sky (1969), contains a song called "Valhalla". Led Zeppelin's "Immigrant Song" from their third album, Led Zeppelin III (1970), contains the following Valhalla reference: "To fight the horde, sing and cry: Valhalla, I am coming." Australian band Skeggs's third album, Rehearsal (2021), contains a song called "Valhalla". 
Jethro Tull's album, Minstrel In The Gallery (1975), contains a song called "Cold Wind To Valhalla".

In 2020's Red, White, and the Blues: A Long and Hard Ride over Treacherous Terrain, John R. Hall (author, blogger, magician) uses Valhalla as a literary vehicle numerous times within the book's text. His most notable usages occurs in the book's front matter and back matter. In "Sursum Corda" (the book's preface), Hall writes: "I tried my best to capture the nearly unexplainable, Zen-like state of being I experienced while on my motorcycle. All I can offer the reader is I glimpsed Valhalla, and Odin assured me I shall dine with him or Freyja after my internal combat ends and this soldier's body is put down." On the book's final text page (before the notes section), Hall states: "Valhalla! 'A man can die but once' (Henry IV, Part 2). I am ready ... now all family business is settled."

See also
 Heorot, a celebrated hall central to the Old English poem Beowulf

Notes

References

 Byock, Jesse (Trans.) (2006). The Prose Edda. Penguin Classics. 
 Faulkes, Anthony (Trans.) (1995). Edda. Everyman. 
 Finlay, Alison (2004). Fagrskinna, a Catalogue of the Kings of Norway: A Translation with Introduction and Notes. Brill Publishers. 
 Hollander, M. Lee (Trans.) (2007). Heimskringla: History of the Kings of Norway . University of Texas Press. 
 Larrington, Carolyne (Trans.) (1999). The Poetic Edda. Oxford World's Classics. 
 Orchard, Andy (1997). Dictionary of Norse Myth and Legend. Cassell. 
 Orel, Vladimir (2003). A Handbook of Germanic Etymology. Brill. 
 Simek, Rudolf (2007) translated by Angela Hall. Dictionary of Northern Mythology. D.S. Brewer 
 Watkins, Calvert (2000). The American Heritage Dictionary of Indo-European Roots. Houghton Mifflin Company. 
 Welch, Chris (2005). Led Zeppelin: Dazed and Confused: The Stories Behind Every Song. Thunder's Mouth Press

External links 

Locations in Norse mythology
Conceptions of heaven
Norse underworld